Podaa Podi ( Go boy, go girl) is a 2012 Indian Tamil-language musical romantic comedy film written and directed by debutant Vignesh Shivan, starring Silambarasan and Varalaxmi Sarathkumar. The score and soundtrack of the film were composed by Dharan Kumar, while cinematography and editing were handled by Duncan Telford and Anthony Gonsalves, respectively. The film started production in 2008 and was released on 13 November 2012, as a Diwali release. the film received mixed reviews.

Plot
Arjun, an animation artist living in London with his uncle, meets Nisha in a pub and tries to impress her by showing his wallet full of fake currency. She is an aspiring dancer who is living with her aunt Veena. After going around together for a day, Nisha proposes a relationship, and Arjun agrees. Arjun hates Nisha attending salsa classes with her friend Mojo as her partner. However, he agrees to marry her.

After their marriage, Nisha makes it clear that she still wants to dance and enter the UK competition "Let's Dance", and make a career for herself. Arjun suddenly discovers that he is, at bottom, a "Pachai Thamizhan" (True Tamilian) who believes that a woman's place is in the home. On the advice of his uncle, he impregnates her, so that she stays away from dancing.

The birth of their first child brings happiness to their family. They go to Hong Kong Disneyland for their babymoon. After they return, in a family conversation, Arjun's uncle mentions his "advice" of making Nisha pregnant so that she would not dance anymore. Realising that the child was the result of Arjun's cheap plan and not love towards her, Nisha walks out. Arjun tries to console her, but gets angry when she meets a friend who greets her with a hug. Arjun, who gets immediately jealous, goes and starts fighting with her friend, while she pleads him to stop. Nisha crosses the road with her baby, which is then suddenly killed by a car. Nisha and Arjun separate and live in sorrow.

Several months later, Arjun comes to Nisha and pleads her aunt to make her come back and says that if he ever has another child (which he definitely wants) it will be only with her. She comes back, on the condition that she continues dancing. However, during her practices she becomes self-conscious due to the things Arjun said to her. Her partner, Mojo, refuses to work with her so Arjun tries to convince him to come back. Arjun then ends up beating Mojo, so that she will be left without a partner and leave the competition. She convinces Arjun to be her partner, but his steps fail in the first round. Impressed by Nisha dancing skills, judges give her another chance, provided she changes her partner. Arjun convinces her to do a dappan koothu dance, which impresses the judges. But she is not happy, because they have to clear 14 rounds to win the competition. Suddenly, Arjun decides to impregnate her again. The film ends with both of them living with their new child.

Cast

 Silambarasan as Arjun
 Varalaxmi Sarathkumar as Nisha
 VTV Ganesh as Arjun's uncle
 Shobana as Veena, Nisha's aunt 
 Jeffrey Warden as Mojo
 Samarth Suraj as Arjun and Nisha's son
 Santhanam in a special appearance in Love Panalama Venama
 Premji Amaren in a special appearance in Love Panalama Venama
 Vignesh Shivan in a special appearance in Love Panalama Venama
 Robert  in a special appearance in Love Panalama Venama

Production

Development 
Vignesh Shivan made a short film and after getting Dharan to compose music for it; showed the film to producers, Gemini Film Circuit, and then to his childhood friend, Silambarasan and both parties agreed to collaborate to make it a feature film. The joint producers of the film, Shanaya Telefilms, released a series of posters in June 2008 publicising the film, while Silambarasan and Vignesh toured in Canada scouting for locations and agreeing a deal with Mayor Ron Stevens to film in Orillia and Toronto. In June 2008, reports emerged that Varalaxmi, daughter of prominent actor-politician Sarathkumar, would play the lead role in the film of a ballet dancer. For his look in the film, Silambarasan worked with Toni & Guy salon and for the initial photo shoot of the film in Mumbai, the producers had stylists from the international brand fly down in August 2008 to give him a new hair cut and styling for his hair. The title of the film went from Podaa Podi to Thiru Poda Thirumathi Podi, before the makers changed it back to the original title.

By December 2008, the film failed to start and reports emerged that Silambarasan would restart Kettavan, a film which he had stalled before. Poor weather in Canada initially delayed the production of the film, with Gemini Films making a statement in June 2009 that the film was not dropped, after media speculation. The film's delays led to Varalaxmi opting out of the film, with her father stating that he would decide when to launch her in the film industry. Subsequently, the film was temporarily put on hold with Silambarasan opting to prioritise other ventures.

Filming 
The film resurfaced and finally began shoot in August 2010 in London and the team shot scenes in a 45-day schedule, with Silambarasan learning salsa for the film under the guidance of Jeffrey Vardon – other choreography was staged by Regan Shepherd The team also shot further scenes in Spain in April 2011, after Silambarasan had temporarily put the film on hold to finish the multi-starrer Vaanam. A song was filmed in Chennai in November 2011, with Santhanam and Premji Amaren making special appearances in the music video. The film went through further delays after Silambarasan committed schedules to finish Osthe and Vettai Mannan, with the film being touted as a Valentine's Day 2012 release. In January 2012, the actor left for the US to work on his studio album "The Love Anthem", resulting in his ongoing film projects getting postponed again. The final portion of the film is to be shot in a ten-day schedule in Macau, Hong Kong from 20 March 2012 onwards. Silambarasan's one-year-old nephew (Silambarasan cousin's Child) Samarth  was revealed to play his son in the film. A song depicting the relationship between a father and son, written by Vaali and sung by Silambarasan himself, was shot with him and Samarth at Hong Kong Disneyland, making Podaa Podi the first Tamil film to be shot there.

Music 

In April 2010, Dharan stated that the soundtrack album would consist of six tracks, further adding that the film's lead actor Silambarasan had sung two songs and that composer-singer Yuvan Shankar Raja would also sing one of the songs. The album finally features eight tracks, including an instrumental, while Silambarasan has sung three songs, of which two were penned by him; a song by Yuvan Shankar Raja was not featured. The title track had been sung by Benny Dayal and actress-singer Andrea Jeremiah. Besides Silambarasan, director Vignesh Shivan had penned the lyrics for four songs, while Na. Muthukumar and Vaali had written each one song.

Release
The film's satellite rights were sold to Star Vijay. Podaa Podi was scheduled to be released on the occasion of Valentine's Day, 14 February 2012. But the film was delayed due to his commitments with other projects. In September 2012, the makers announced that the film will be released on the Diwali festival season, which falls on 13 November 2012, along with Vijay-starrer Thuppakki (2012). Initially, Silambarasan's another film Vaalu was scheduled to be released on the same day, but later pushed it to January 2013. The film released in United States and Canada on 16 November 2012, three days after the original release.

Reception 
The film opened to mixed reviews from critics. The Times of India gave 3 out of 5 stating "Podaa Podi is strictly a movie for youngsters. The story is lopsided at most times, titling towards the man's point-of-view. It might win loud applause in the theatres, but it is doubtful as to how many viewers will support it otherwise." Behindwoods gave the film 2.5 out of 5 and stated "Podaa Podi is an ideal festival outing for youth, which has good looking cast, fun moments, nice songs and a few peppy dance numbers. Malathi Ranganathan of The Hindu stated "More than half a dozen times in the film, the hero says, 'Very good Ma!' But you can't say the same about PP." Sify gave 3 out of 5 stars and stated "Podaa Podi is a lovely romantic ride with some peppy music." Pavithra Srinivasan of Rediff gave 2.5 out of 5 reviewed "Despite Varu's great performance, Poda Podi ends in a disappointing fashion." Moviecrow gave the film a rating of 3 out of 5 stating "Once out of the theatre, nothing about Poda Podi remains in your mind. It however keeps you quite entertained during its running time. If that was the intention of Vignesh he has succeeded to a great extent. The film might not appeal to the family audiences but should click with the youngsters, with its short duration being a major plus."

Awards

References

External links
 

2012 films
2012 romantic comedy films
2010s Tamil-language films
Films shot in London
Films shot in Macau
Indian romantic comedy films
2012 directorial debut films
Films scored by Dharan Kumar